Gnorimoschema ramulata is a moth in the family Gelechiidae. It was described by Edward Meyrick in 1926. It is found in India.

References

Gnorimoschema
Moths described in 1926